Fusifilum is a genus of bulbous flowering plants in the family Asparagaceae, subfamily Scilloideae (also treated as the family Hyacinthaceae). It is distributed in southern Africa (South Africa, Lesotho, Swaziland, Namibia). Some sources consider that all the species should be placed in the genus Drimia.

Systematics

The genus Fusifilum was created by Constantine Samuel Rafinesque-Schmaltz in 1837, the type species being F. physodes. In 2001, some species were moved from other genera (such as Drimia) into Fusifilum. Other species were newly created. A molecular phylogenetic analysis by Manning et al. in 2004 concluded that the genus was not monophyletic and that the species should all be placed in the genus Drimia.

Fusifilum is placed in the tribe Urgineeae (or the subfamily Urgineoideae by those who use the family Hyacinthaceae).

Species

, the World Checklist of Selected Plant Families recognized the following species:

Fusifilum bruce-bayeri U.Müll.-Doblies, J.S.Tang & D.Müll.-Doblies
Fusifilum capitatum (Hook.f.) Speta
Fusifilum crenulatum U.Müll.-Doblies, J.S.Tang & D.Müll.-Doblies
Fusifilum depressum (Baker) U.Müll.-Doblies, J.S.Tang & D.Müll.-Doblies
Fusifilum emdeorum J.S.Tang & Weiglin
Fusifilum gifbergense U.Müll.-Doblies, J.S.Tang & D.Müll.-Doblies
Fusifilum glaucum U.Müll.-Doblies, J.S.Tang & D.Müll.-Doblies
Fusifilum hei U.Müll.-Doblies, J.S.Tang & D.Müll.-Doblies
Fusifilum magicum U.Müll.-Doblies, J.S.Tang & D.Müll.-Doblies
Fusifilum minus (A.V.Duthie) Speta
Fusifilum oliverorum U.Müll.-Doblies, J.S.Tang & D.Müll.-Doblies
Fusifilum papillosum U.Müll.-Doblies, J.S.Tang & D.Müll.-Doblies
Fusifilum physodes (Jacq.) Raf. ex Speta
Fusifilum spirale U.Müll.-Doblies, J.S.Tang & D.Müll.-Doblies
Fusifilum stoloniferum U.Müll.-Doblies, J.S.Tang & D.Müll.-Doblies

References

Asparagaceae genera
Scilloideae
Taxa named by Constantine Samuel Rafinesque